Mark Abrahams (born 30 September 1978, Leeds, England) is an English guitarist, known as current member of Wishbone Ash. He replaced guitarist Muddy Manninen in May 2017.

References

External links

Wishbone Ash members
1978 births
Living people
English rock guitarists
Musicians from Leeds